Inka Wasi or Inkawasi (Quechua inka Inca, wasi house, "Inca house", Hispanicized spelling Incahuasi) is an archaeological site in Peru. It is located in the Ayacucho Region, Parinacochas Province, Pullo District.

See also 
 Parinaqucha
 Sara Sara

References 

Archaeological sites in Peru
Archaeological sites in Ayacucho Region
Inca